The South Africa's Women's cricket team faced Pakistan at United Arab Emirates from 13 to 22 March 2015. The tour consisted of three One Day International (ODI) matches and three Twenty20 International (T20I). The ODI games were part of the 2014–16 ICC Women's Championship.

Squads

ODI series

1st ODI

2nd ODI

3rd ODI

T20I series

1st T20I

2nd T20I

3rd T20I

References

External links 
Series home at ESPN Cricinfo

2014–16 ICC Women's Championship
International cricket competitions in 2015
Pak
Pakistan women's national cricket team
2015 in women's cricket
2015 in South African cricket
2015 in Pakistani cricket
2015 in Emirati cricket
2015 in South African women's sport
International cricket competitions in the United Arab Emirates